Durbe Parish is an administrative unit of South Kurzeme Municipality, Latvia. The parish has a population of 463 (as of 1/07/2010) and covers an area of 74 km2.

Villages of Durbe parish 
 Krupmuiža
 Līguti
 Padones skola
 Prāmciems
 Raibāmuiža

References

Parishes of Latvia
South Kurzeme Municipality
Courland